Mars: The Secret Science is a documentary science television series narrated by David O'Brien which the Science Channel broadcast in 2016 and 2018.

Content

Mars: The Secret Science looks at how scientists and modern explorers are working to get humans to Mars. The series both explores Mars and chronicles how the National Aeronautics and Space Administration (NASA) is building rockets and spacecraft to carry astronauts there and how technology visionaries are designing Martian colonies. The series also looks at issues such as the design of spacesuits for use on Mars and of the vehicles humans will need for transportation there.

In 2018, the Science Channel broadcast specials under the title Mars: The Secret Science, some of which consisted entirely of segments broadcast previously in episodes of Mars: The Secret Science, How the Universe Works, The Planets and Beyond, or Strip the Cosmos .

Episode list

Season 1 (2016)
SOURCES ihavenotv.com Mars: The Secret ScienceTV Maze Mars: The Secret Science Episode List

Specials (2018)

SOURCES TV Maze Mysteries on the Red PlanetTV Maze NASA's Mission to Mars: InSight Lander

See also
Alien Planet
Cosmos: A Spacetime Odyssey
Extreme Universe
How the Universe Works
Into the Universe with Stephen Hawking
Killers of the Cosmos
Space's Deepest Secrets
Strip the Cosmos
Through the Wormhole
The Universe

References

External links
Mars - The Secret Science - Episode 1 of 5 on YouTube
Mars - The Secret Science excerpt "Scientists Think Mars Once Had Water. So What Happened to It?" on YouTube
Mars - The Secret Science excerpt "Here's How Scientists Will Measure Quakes on Mars" on YouTube
Mars - The Secret Science excerpt "Would You Take the One Way Trip to Mars?" on YouTube
Mars - The Secret Science excerpt "SpaceX Wants to Send You To Mars. Here's How They Plan to Do It" on YouTube
Mars - The Secret Science excerpt "Testing the Curiosity Rover on Earth" on YouTube
Mars - The Secret Science excerpt "Looking For Ancient Martian Lakes" on YouTube
Mars - The Secret Science excerpt "Something in the Martian Sand is Explosive!" on YouTube
Mars - The Secret Science excerpt "This is How NASA Guides Robots Around Mars" on YouTube
Mars - The Secret Science excerpt "First Step In Training For Work on Mars: Go Underwater" on YouTube
Mars - The Secret Science excerpt "Engineers Have Already Built Vehicles to Drive on the Martian Surface" on YouTube
Mars - The Secret Science excerpt "Scientists Are Designing the Spacesuits We'll Wear on Mars" on YouTube

2016 American television series debuts
2018 American television series endings
2010s American documentary television series
Documentary television series about astronomy
Science Channel original programming